The Very Best of Alan Jackson is the fourth greatest hits compilation album by American country artist Alan Jackson. It was released in the United States on June 14, 2004 on the Sony BMG International label.

Content
The release includes 18 greatest hits from Alan Jackson's studio albums:

Here in the Real World (1990)
 "Here in the Real World"
 "Chasin' That Neon Rainbow"
Don't Rock the Jukebox (1991)
 "Don't Rock the Jukebox"
 "Midnight in Montgomery"
A Lot About Livin' (And a Little 'bout Love) (1992)
 "Chattahoochee"
 "She's Got the Rhythm (And I Got the Blues)"
Who I Am (1994)
 "Livin' on Love"
 "Gone Country"
Everything I Love (1996)
 "Little Bitty"
 "Everything I Love"
 "Who's Cheatin' Who"
High Mileage (1998)
 "Right on the Money"
 "Little Man"
Under the Influence (1999)
 "Pop a Top"
 "It Must Be Love"
When Somebody Loves You (2000)
 "www.memory"
Drive (2002)
 "Drive (For Daddy Gene)"
 "Where Were You (When the World Stopped Turning)"

and two hits from his compilation albums:

The Greatest Hits Collection (1995)
 "Tall, Tall Trees"
Greatest Hits Volume II... and Some Other Stuff (2003)
 "It's Five O'Clock Somewhere"

Track listing

Charts and certifications
The Very Best of Alan Jackson debuted at #47 on the UK Albums Chart on week 27/2004, where it stayed for one week.

Certifications

References

2004 compilation albums
Alan Jackson compilation albums
Sony BMG compilation albums